Kaligi may refer to:

 Kaligi people, an ethnic group of South Sudan
 Kaligi language, their language

See also 
 Căligi, a village in Romania
 Khaligi (disambiguation)

Language and nationality disambiguation pages